Frédéric Hantz (born 30 May 1966) is a French professional football manager and former player who played as a midfielder.

Managerial career
Hantz formerly managed Sochaux, who had a playing career before coaching. On 18 December, he was named as new head coach by Le Havre and was released after the end of his contract on 30 June 2010.

On 20 May 2010, Hantz replaced Faruk Hadžibegić as SC Bastia coach.

In January 2016, Hantz replaced the duo of Pascal Baills and Bruno Martini as Montpellier coach. He succeeded in his mission of keeping the club in Ligue 1, with Montpellier ending the season ranking 12th for the 2015–16 season.

In January 2017, following a difficult start to the second part of the season, the hardcore supporters of Montpellier, Butte Paillade 91, demonstrated their support for Hantz by showing up at the team's training with slogans in support of the coach and speaking out in his favour.

On 30 January 2017, he was replaced as Montpellier coach by former Paris Saint-Germain assistant coach and France national team assistant coach Jean-Louis Gasset, and former Bastia coach Ghislain Printant.

Managerial statistics

Honours
Bastia
Championnat National: 2010–11
Ligue 2: 2011–12

Individual
Ligue 2 Manager of the Year: 2011–12

References

External links

1966 births
Living people
People from Rodez
Sportspeople from Aveyron
Association football midfielders
French footballers
Ligue 1 players
Rodez AF players
FC Aurillac Arpajon Cantal Auvergne players
Clermont Foot players
FC Istres players
FC Metz players
OGC Nice players
Chamois Niortais F.C. players
French football managers
Le Mans FC managers
FC Sochaux-Montbéliard managers
Le Havre AC managers
SC Bastia managers
FC Metz managers
Rodez AF managers
Montpellier HSC managers
Ligue 1 managers
Ligue 2 managers
Footballers from Occitania (administrative region)